Anton Innauer (born 1 April 1958) is an Austrian former ski jumper.

Career
His best-known success was at the 1980 Winter Olympics in Lake Placid, New York, where he won a gold medal in the individual normal hill event. Innauer also won a silver medal in the individual large hill at the 1976 Winter Olympics in Innsbruck and the ski jumping event at the Holmenkollen ski festival in 1975. He also won the silver medal at the Ski flying World Championships in Vikersund in 1977.

On 5 March 1976, he set the ski jumping world record distance at 174 metres (571 ft). And again two days later improved world record at 176 metres (577 ft), both of them set in Oberstdorf, West Germany.

Innauer retired from competitions in 1980 due to an ankle injury. In 1987, he graduated from the University of Graz with a degree in philosophy, psychology, and sports science. His thesis was on the sociology of ski jumping. Between 1987 and 1989, he was a ski jumper and ski jumping coach. In 1989–1992 and 2001/02, he trained the Austrian ski jumping team. In 1993–2001 and since 2002, he has been director of Nordic skiing in the Austrian Ski Federation (ÖSV). He is also the ski jumping expert for German TV channel ZDF.

At a 1976 (March 5–7) ski jumping event in Oberstdorf, Germany, Innauer became the first person to achieve perfect marks from all five judges (20 points maximum). This mark has been matched by only five others since: Kazuyoshi Funaki at the 1998 Winter Olympics in Nagano, Sven Hannawald and Hideharu Miyahira at the same 2003 World Cup competition in Willingen, Germany, Wolfgang Loitzl at Bischofshofen, Austria in 2009 during the 2008/09 Four Hills Tournament. and Peter Prevc in 2015 World Cup competition in Planica

World Cup

Standings

Wins

Ski jumping world records

References

External links

Holmenkollen winners since 1892 – click Vinnere for downloadable pdf file 

1958 births
Austrian male ski jumpers
Austrian ski jumping coaches
Ski jumpers at the 1976 Winter Olympics
Ski jumpers at the 1980 Winter Olympics
Holmenkollen Ski Festival winners
Living people
Olympic gold medalists for Austria
Olympic ski jumpers of Austria
Olympic medalists in ski jumping
Medalists at the 1980 Winter Olympics
Medalists at the 1976 Winter Olympics
Olympic silver medalists for Austria
People from Bregenz District
Recipients of the Decoration of Honour for Services to the Republic of Austria
Sportspeople from Vorarlberg